Rebecca Catherine Gibney (born 14 December 1964) is a New Zealand actress known for her roles on Australian television in The Flying Doctors, Halifax f.p., Packed to the Rafters, Winter and Wanted. She is a Gold Logie winner and has featured in a number of Australian films including Mental and The Dressmaker.

Biography
Gibney is the youngest of six children; born in Levin, New Zealand and brought up in Wellington, where she attended Wellington Girls' College. She recounted that she was a "bit odd" as a child, stating "I was a bit like Wednesday Addams in The Addams Family. "I walked around with this headless doll that I took everywhere." Gibney moved to Australia at the age of 19 after graduating from high school.

Performance career
Gibney worked as a model, then appeared on television in the New Zealand kidult series Sea Urchins from 1980 to 1984. She broke into Australian television with the role of Julie Davis in the children's series Zoo Family in 1985. She went on to play mechanic Emma Plimpton in the popular drama series The Flying Doctors, and in 1990 starred in the mini-series Come In Spinner. In 1991 she starred in the Channel Nine sitcom All Together Now, leaving the series in 1993. After her departure, she starred in Snowy.

The title character of Dr. Jane Halifax in Halifax f.p. was created especially for her by the producers of her previous show Snowy. Halifax f.p. debuted in 1994 with the episode "Acts Of Betrayal", and continued with a further 20 telemovies leading up until 2002. She has also appeared in other mini-series, like Kangaroo Palace (1997), and in The Day of the Roses (in 1998).

In 2002 and 2003, Gibney had a role in Stingers, and from 2003 until 2006, she had a role in the telemovie trilogy Small Claims as Chrissy, co-starring with Claudia Karvan. She appeared in the movie adaptation of Stephen King's novel Salem's Lot, released in 2004, and then followed up in 2006 with King's Nightmares and Dreamscapes TV mini-series. In 2006, she played the role of Lydia, a hippie restaurant owner and operator in the Network Ten drama series Tripping Over. In 2007, she had a small role in the film Clubland, starring Brenda Blethyn, and directed by Cherie Nowlan. The film is known as Introducing the Dwights in the United States.

A series of Australian television adverts for Advil in 2006/07 have featured Gibney and her family. A new television advert with only Gibney appeared in October 2007. She hosted four seasons (2006-2010) of a documentary series produced by Television New Zealand called Sensing Murder in which unsolved New Zealand murder or missing person cases are probed by psychic investigators from both New Zealand and Australia. Gibney was executive producer and also starred in New Zealand feature film The Map Reader as Amelia alongside Michael Hurst and played the mother of Michael, the map reader of the title. The film was released in 2008.

From August 2008 until its conclusion in 2013, Gibney played the female lead of Julie Rafter on the Seven Network's Packed to the Rafters. Her role in the show proved popular for Gibney, and she won the Gold Logie in 2009 for the show. In 2010, she played the lead role on Channel Ten's telemovie Wicked Love: The Maria Korp Story. She starred in the 2012 movie Mental alongside Toni Collette. On 23 October 2013, the Seven Network announced that Gibney would star in and produce a new crime drama, The Killing Field, which was released in 2014. Gibney plays a detective tasked with solving the murder of a teenage girl in a small town. Winter, a follow-up series to her 2014 telemovie The Killing Field, screened in 2015.

Personal life
Gibney has been married twice, first to Irwin Thomas ( Jack Jones, former lead singer of Southern Sons) in 1992, which ended in divorce. She married production designer Richard Bell in November 2001. They have a son born on 7 April 2004.  She currently lives in Dunedin, New Zealand.

Filmography

Film

Television

Awards
Gibney has won, and has been nominated, for several television awards at the AFIs and the Logies on numerous occasions in her acting career.

She won her first award in 1990, winning the AFI (Australian Film Institute) Award for Best Actress for her role in Come In Spinner. She also won a peer-nominated Most Outstanding Actress Logie award in 1991 for her role in the show. She was also nominated in the Most Popular Actress in a Telemovie or Mini-Series award for her role.

In 1992, she was nominated at the Logies for her role in the sitcom All Together Now in two categories: Most Popular Actress and Most Popular Light Entertainment / Comedy Female Performer.

Her role as the lead in Halifax f.p. had Gibney nominated for three different awards – Most Popular Actress at the Logies (in 1996, 1997, 1998, 1999 and 2001); Most Outstanding Actress at the Logies (in 1998, 1999 and 2000) and Best Performance by an Actress in a Leading Role in a Television Drama at the AFI's (in 1998 and 2000).

Gibney's role in the telemovie Small Claims led her to another nomination at the 2005 Logies in the Most Outstanding Actress category.

A popular role for Gibney has been on Packed to the Rafters. Her role in this has led her to win the 2009 Gold Logie and the 2009 Most Popular Actress award. She also been nominated at the Logies for the Gold Logie in 2010 and 2011, Most Popular Actress in 2010, 2011, and 2012, and Most Outstanding Actress in 2009. At the AFI Awards she was nominated in 2009, in the Best Lead Actress in a Drama award.

References

External links

1964 births
Living people
AACTA Award winners
Naturalised citizens of Australia
New Zealand television actresses
New Zealand emigrants to Australia
People from Levin, New Zealand
Gold Logie winners
People educated at Wellington Girls' College